Two ships of the Royal Navy have been named HMS Holderness. They were "Hunt-class" ships of different periods, named after the Holderness Hunt which operates in the Holderness area of Yorkshire.

  was a  minesweeper launched in 1916, commissioned in 1917, paid off in 1920 and sold for breaking up in 1924.
  was a  launched and commissioned in 1940, paid off in 1946 and scrapped in 1956.

References

Royal Navy ship names